This Earth, My Brother is a 1971 novel by Ghanaian novelist Kofi Awooner published, later republished by Heinemann as part of the influential African Writers Series.

Development and context 
Awoonor started writing the novel in 1963—and it was a "straightforward narrative" which Awoonor compared to works by Conrad and Joyce. Subsequently, Awoonor wrote other sections: original printing of the novel included two types of printed material: the narrative section, and other sections written after the initial draft. The intermixed narrative strategies radically changed assumptions about what African novels should include.

Academic Kwame Ayivor describes the novel as a fictional representation of the mythology and worldview of the Ewe people. Ayivor describes the style of using this material, as very similar to Ayi Kwei Armah's The Healers (1979).

Critical reception 
In an obituary for Awooner, British writer Nii Parkes called the novel "wonderfully musical prose, its immersion in Accra's history, its obvious confidence in its place in the world, made me go to my father and ask about the other uncle."

References 

African Writers Series
1971 novels
Ghana in fiction